A number of concertos and concertante works have been written for cor anglais (English horn) and string, wind, chamber, or full orchestra.

English horn concertos appeared about a century later than oboe solo pieces, mostly because until halfway through the 18th century different instruments (the taille de hautbois, vox humana and the oboe da caccia) had the role of the tenor or alto instrument in the oboe family. The modern English horn was developed from the oboe da caccia in the 1720s, probably in Silesia. The earliest known English horn concertos were written in the 1770s, mostly by prominent oboists of the day, such as  Giuseppe Ferlendis, Ignaz Malzat (and his non-oboist brother Johann Michael Malzat) and Joseph Lacher. Few of these works have survived. Among the oldest extant English horn concertos are those by Josef Fiala (a period transcription of a piece originally for viola da gamba) and Anton Milling. It is known that Milling's concerti were  performed in 1782 by the Italian oboist Giovanni Palestrini.

Many solos in orchestral works were written for the English horn and a decent amount of chamber music appeared for it as well. However, few solo works with a large ensemble were written for the instrument until well into the 20th century. Since then the repertoire has expanded considerably. Of the 270+ concertos listed below, only 35 predate the Second World War.

Solo concertos

Double and triple concertos

Sources

References and footnotes

See also
Oboe concerto
Oboe d'amore concerto
Bass oboe concerto

 
Classical music lists